Elections to Lancaster City Council were held on 5 May 2011. Lancaster City Council is a secondary-level district council in Lancashire. The whole council was up for election and, following the result, remains in No Overall Control.

The Local Government Boundary Commission for England reviewed the electoral wards of Lancaster City Council in 2014 with the new electoral map to be elected for the first time at the 2015 Lancaster City Council election.

Following the election in 2011 the composition of the council was as follows:

Election results

Ward results

Bare Ward

Bolton-Le-Sands ward

Bulk ward

Carnforth ward

Castle ward

Dukes ward

Ellel ward

Halton-with-Aughton ward

Harbour ward

Heysham Central ward

Heysham North ward

Heysham South ward

John O'Gaunt ward

Kellet ward

Lower Lune Valley ward

Overton ward

Poulton ward

Scotforth East ward

Scotforth West ward

Silverdale ward

Skerton East ward

Skerton West ward

Slyne-with-Hest ward

Torrisholme ward

University ward

Upper Lune Valley ward

Warton ward

Westgate ward

External links
Lancaster City Council Notice of Poll
Lancaster City Council election results

Lancaster
2011
2010s in Lancashire